Thomas B. Ferguson (September 24, 1892 – December 8, 1979) was an American football tackle for the Louisville Brecks of the American Professional Football Association (APFA) which later became the National Football League (NFL).

References

1892 births
1979 deaths
American football tackles
Players of American football from Indiana
People from Henryville, Indiana
Louisville Brecks players